The Ci En Pagoda is a pagoda in Yuchi Township, Nantou County, Taiwan.

History
President Chiang Kai-shek decided to construct the pagoda as a memory to his late mother Wang Caiyu. During the construction, materials had to be brought in through the Sun Moon Lake and up the mountain. The construction was then completed by April 1971.

Architecture
The lower 3 floors were painted in white and the upper 9 floors were painted in golden red.

Transportation
The pagoda is accessible by bus from Taichung TRA Station or Taichung HSR Station.

See also
 List of tourist attractions in Taiwan

References

Bibliography
 

1971 establishments in Taiwan
Buildings and structures in Nantou County
Pagodas in Taiwan
Religious buildings and structures completed in 1971